Sulfatase-modifying factor 2 is an enzyme that in humans is encoded by the SUMF2 gene.

The catalytic sites of sulfatases are only active if they contain a unique amino acid, C-alpha-formylglycine (FGly). The FGly residue is posttranslationally generated from a cysteine by enzymes with FGly-generating activity. The gene described in this record is a member of the sulfatase-modifying factor family and encodes a protein with a DUF323 domain that localizes to the lumen of the endoplasmic reticulum. This protein has low levels of FGly-generating activity but can heterodimerize with another family member - a protein with high levels of FGly-generating activity. Alternate transcriptional splice variants, encoding different isoforms, have been characterized.

References

Further reading